Diaperia verna, common names spring pygmycudweed, spring rabbit-tobacco or many-stem rabbit-tobacco, is a plant species in the sunflower family, native to northern Mexico (from Sonora to Tamaulipas) and the southern United States (from Arizona to Louisiana, with isolated populations (possibly introductions) in Alabama, Georgia, South Carolina).

Diaperia verna is an herb with greenish or grayish leaves due to a coating of woolly hairs. One plant usually produces several flower heads, the corollas hidden by surrounding bracts.

Varieties
 Diaperia verna var. drummondii (Torr. & A.Gray) Morefield -  coastal Alabama + Texas
 Diaperia verna var. verna - Arizona, Arkansas, Georgia, Louisiana, New Mexico, Oklahoma, South Carolina, Texas; Mexico (Chihuahua, Coahuila, Nuevo León, Sonora, Tamaulipas).

References

Gnaphalieae
Flora of the United States
Flora of Mexico
Plants described in 1833
Taxa named by Constantine Samuel Rafinesque